Sandra Saouaf is an American immunologist who researches autoimmune diseases, such as rheumatoid arthritis, type 1 diabetes, multiple sclerosis and others.

Biography
Sandra Jerrold-Jones obtained a BA from Rutgers College in biochemistry and went on to earn a PhD in immunology from the University of Pennsylvania. After completion of her degree, Saouaf went to work in the cell signaling laboratory of Bristol-Myers Squibb where she completed her post doctorate fellowship. She then worked briefly at GlaxoSmithKline before returning to the University of Pennsylvania.  Saouaf left the university and began a consulting business with pharmaceutical and biotechnical companies, hoping to help speed the process of discoveries for drugs to treat autoimmune disease. In 2012, together with University of Pennsylvania colleagues, she "discovered a possible treatment approach...through oral drugs" and founded Atlantic Bio Sci, LLC. In 2013, she won a Fellowship from the Alliance of Women Entrepreneurs.

Selected works

References

Bibliography

External links 
 WorldCat publications list

American immunologists
Living people
American women biologists
20th-century American biologists
21st-century biologists
21st-century American scientists
20th-century American women scientists
21st-century American women scientists
Year of birth missing (living people)